Mattison is a surname. Notable people with the surname include:

Alexander Mattison (born 1998), American football player
Andrew Mattison (1948–2005), medical psychologist and researcher
Bryan Mattison (born 1984), American football guard
Donald Mattison (1905–1975), American artist
Greg Mattison (born 1949), American football coach
Harry Mattison (born 1948), American photographer
Jenna Mattison (born 1976), American actress, screenwriter and producer
Landy Mattison (born 1983), American soccer defender
Mike Mattison, American musician and the lead vocalist of The Derek Trucks Band
Alice Mattison, American novelist and short story writer

See also
Keasbey and Mattison Company, manufacturing company that produced asbestos and related building products before being purchased by Turner & Newall in 1934
Mattisson